Shixia station is a station on Lines 3 and 7 of the Shenzhen Metro. Line 3 platforms opened on 28 June 2011 and Line 7 platforms opened on 28 October 2016.

Station layout

Exits

References

Railway stations in Guangdong
Shenzhen Metro stations
Futian District
Railway stations in China opened in 2011